Marie-Claire Jamet (born 27 November 1933 in Reims) is a French classical harpist.

Biography 
Marie-Claire Jamet is the daughter of Pierre Jamet, also a harpist.

After winning the 1st prize of harp and the 1st prize of chamber music at the Conservatoire de Paris, Marie-Claire Jamet was harp solo of the National Orchestra of Radio France, then soloist of the Ensemble Inter-Contemporain directed by Pierre Boulez. She now dedicates herself to her solo activity.

Marie-Claire Jamet has given more than 2000 concerts in the United States, Europe, Japan, India, Russia, Canada, Australia, etc.

She has created numerous works for harp and orchestra, flute and harp, harp alone.

From 1959 to 1978, she also headed the "Marie-Claire Jamet quintet", composed of a flute, a string trio and a harp.

Christian Lardé, José Sanchez, Jacques Dejean,  and Pierre Degenne were parts of this renown quintet that left many recordings.

Discography (partial) 
 Françaix, Haendel, Debussy, Carl Philipp Emanuel Bach. Récital flute and harp. With Christian Lardé (flute). 
 Claude Debussy : l'essentiel de son œuvre. Choirs of the  Opéra de Paris, The London Symphony Orchestra and orchestre de la Radio Suisse italienne. 
 Mozart. Two concertos for flute. With Christian Lardé. Orchestra under the direction of Paul Kuentz. CD, Arion
 Six danses populaires roumaines. With Christian Lardé. CD, Arion
 Pièce en forme de habanera. With Christian Lardé. Arion Paris
 Maurice Ravel, collection "Sur les traces de…". CD, With Christian Lardé (flute) and Guy Deplus (clarinet). Orchestre national de Paris, under the direction of Manuel Rosenthal. Prelude and fugue
 Romance: les plus beaux airs classiques pour se détendre.

Honours 
Marie-Claire Jamet was made a chevalier of the Légion d'honneur 16 March 1995, then an officer 13 July 2012.

References

External links  
 Marie-Claire Jamet's discography on Discogs
 Entretien avec Marie-Claire Jamet on HarpBlog
 Quintette Marie-Claire Jamet Introduction et allegro pour harpe on INA.fr (16 June 1963)
 Portrait of Marie-Claire Jamet on YouTube

French classical harpists
1933 births
Living people
Musicians from Reims
Officiers of the Légion d'honneur
20th-century French women musicians